Acesta vitrina  is a species of marine bivalve mollusc in the family Limidae.

Original description
   Poppe G.T., Tagaro S.P. & Stahlschmidt P. (2015). New shelled molluscan species from the central Philippines I. Visaya. 4(3): 15-59.
page(s): 38, pl. 18 figs 1-2.

References

Limidae